The inorganic dye ammoniated ruthenium oxychloride, also known as ruthenium red, is used in histology to stain aldehyde fixed mucopolysaccharides.

Ruthenium red (RR) has also been used as a pharmacological tool to study specific cellular mechanisms. Selectivity is a significant issue in such studies as RR is known to interact with many proteins. These include mammalian ion channels (CatSper1, TASK, RyR1, RyR2, RyR3, TRPM6, TRPM8, TRPV1, TRPV2, TRPV3, TRPV4, TRPV5, TRPV6, TRPA1, mCa1, mCa2, CALHM1) TRPP3, a plant ion channel, Ca2+-ATPase, mitochondrial Ca2+ uniporter, tubulin, myosin light-chain phosphatase, and Ca2+ binding proteins such as calmodulin. Ruthenium red displays nanomolar potency against several of its binding partners (e.g. TRPV4, ryanodine receptors,...). For example, it is a potent inhibitor of intracellular calcium release by ryanodine receptors  (Kd ~20 nM).  As a TRPA1 blocker, it assists in reducing the airway inflammation caused by pepper spray.

RR has been used on plant material since 1890 for staining pectins, mucilages, and gums. RR is a stereoselective stain for pectic acid, insofar as the staining  site occurs between each monomer unit and the next adjacent neighbor.

References

Staining dyes
Ruthenium complexes
Ammine complexes